Billy Slais(name pronunciation BI-lee SLAYZ), is an American musician, who is part Cherokee Indian, a Vietnam Vet, and raised in Memphis, Tennessee, United States. 

Slais has worked with: Melvin Seals, Allan Blazek, Dave Grover, Reni Slais, Bill Lamb, Ross Hayashida, Terry Hanck, Bob Claire, Chuck Brooke, Amos Garrett, Greg Adams, Mike Keck, Mic Gillette, Debbie Cathey, Tower of Power, Richard Betts, Maurice Cridlin, and Carlo Driggs.

Selected discography
Elvin Bishop – Struttin' My Stuff (1975) : Synthesizer, keyboards, vocals (bckgr).
Elvin Bishop – Hometown Boy Makes Good! (1976) : Synthesizer, piano, keyboards, saxophone (alto and tenor), clavinet, electric saxophone, string ensemble.
Mickey Thomas – As Long as You Love Me (1976) : Bass, saxophone, clavinet.
Elvin Bishop – Raisin' Hell (1977) : Organ, synthesizer, keyboards, saxophone (alto and tenor), clavinet.
Elvin Bishop – Best of Elvin Bishop (1979) : Keyboards.
Amos Garrett – Go Cat Go (1991) : Saxophone.
Elvin Bishop – Sure Feels Good: The Best of Elvin (1992) : Synthesizer, vocals (bckgr).
Elvin Bishop – 20th Century Masters - The... (2002) : Organ, synthesizer, piano, saxophone (alto and tenor), vocals (bckgr), clavinet.
Craig Chaquico – Follow the Sun (2009) – featuring "Circus Beach" co-written by Slais.
Craig Chaquico – Fire Red Moon (2012) : Keyboards, vocals (bckgr).

References

Year of birth missing (living people)
Living people
Jefferson Starship members
American session musicians